Olympic Dcheira is a Moroccan football club based in Dcheira El Jihadia currently playing in the Botola 2. The club was founded in 1940.

References

Football clubs in Morocco
1940 establishments in Morocco
Association football clubs established in 1940
Inezgane-Aït Melloul